is a passenger railway station  located in the city of Yonago, Tottori Prefecture, Japan. It is operated by the West Japan Railway Company (JR West).

Lines

Station layout
The station consists of two opposed side platforms located on an embankment, connected a footbridge.The station is unattended and there is no station building.

Platforms

History
Higashiyamakōen Station opened on 18 March 1993.

Passenger statistics
In fiscal 2018, the station was used by an average of 746 passengers daily.

Surrounding area
Yonago City Higashiyama Athletic Park
Yonago Municipal Higashiyama Athletic Stadium
Yonago Municipal Baseball Stadium

See also
List of railway stations in Japan

References

External links 

 0640790 Higashiyamakōen Station from JR-Odekake.net 

Railway stations in Tottori Prefecture
Stations of West Japan Railway Company
Sanin Main Line
Railway stations in Japan opened in 1993
Yonago, Tottori